The Dame Annabelle Rankin Award is a biennial award presented by the Queensland Branch of the Children's Book Council of Australia.

In 1977, Dame Annabelle Rankin was one of the first people to be made a Life Member of the Queensland Branch of Children’s Book Council of Australia.

Winners

See also

 List of CBCA Awards
 List of Australian literary awards

References

External links
 Children's Book Council of Australia Awards
 CBCA Dame Annabelle Rankin Award

Children's Book Council of Australia
Australian children's literary awards